Hašek is a Czech surname. The feminine gender is Hašková. Notable people with the surname include:

 Dominik Hašek, Czech ice hockey goaltender
 The asteroid 8217 Dominikhašek, named in honour of Dominik Hašek's Olympic gold
 Eliška Hašková-Coolidge, Special Assistant to the U.S. Presidents
 Eduard Hašek, Czech athlete
 Filip Hašek, Czech footballer
 Jaroslav Hašek (1883–1923), Czech writer known for the novel The Good Soldier Švejk
 Asteroid 2734 Hašek named after Jaroslav Hašek
 Ivan Hašek, Czech footballer and coach
 Martin Hašek, Czech footballer and coach
 Martin Hašek (footballer, born 1995), Czech footballer
 Michal Hašek, Czech politician

Czech-language surnames